Ximena Córdoba Londoño is a Colombian model and actress. She hosts TNT Movie Club on TNT and Despierta America on Univision. Her career began with participation in the reality TV program Protagonistas de novela on RCN, and a starring role in the series Francisco el Matemático.

Filmography

References

External links
 Profile at IMDb
 Colarte information
 Terra information

Colombian female models
Colombian television personalities
Living people
People from Medellín
1979 births